Paul Marquart (born January 9, 1957) is a Minnesota politician and member of the Minnesota House of Representatives. A member of the Minnesota Democratic–Farmer–Labor Party, he represents District 4B, which includes parts of Becker, Clay, and Norman counties in the northwestern part of the state. He is also a teacher.

Marquart was first elected to the House in 2000 and has been reelected every two years since.

Marquart graduated from Fargo North High School in Fargo, North Dakota, then went on to North Dakota State College of Science in Wahpeton, receiving his A.A., and to the University of North Dakota in Grand Forks, earning his B.A. in journalism in 1980 and his B.S. in social studies education in 1981. He earned his M.S. in education administration from Tri-College University in 1985. He has been a teacher in the Dilworth-Glyndon-Felton School District since 1984.

Marquart was a member of the Dilworth City Council from 1988 to 1989 and the city's mayor from 1990 to 2000.

References

External links 

 Rep. Marquart Web Page
 Minnesota Public Radio Votetracker: Rep. Paul Marquart
 Project Votesmart - Rep. Paul Marquart Profile

1957 births
Living people
People from Clay County, Minnesota
Politicians from Fargo, North Dakota
Democratic Party members of the Minnesota House of Representatives
Minnesota city council members
Mayors of places in Minnesota
North Dakota State College of Science alumni
University of North Dakota alumni
Schoolteachers from Minnesota
21st-century American politicians